Nishan Singh (born 3 September 1987) is an Indian first-class cricketer who plays for Services. He made his Twenty20 debut for Services in the 2016–17 Inter State Twenty-20 Tournament on 29 January 2017.

References

External links
 

1987 births
Living people
Indian cricketers
Services cricketers
Cricketers from Rajasthan